St. Michael's Roman Catholic Church is a historic church at 74 Cianci Street in Paterson, Passaic County, New Jersey, United States.

It was built in 1836 and added to the National Register in 1978.

See also
National Register of Historic Places listings in Passaic County, New Jersey

References

Buildings and structures in Paterson, New Jersey
Roman Catholic churches in New Jersey
Churches on the National Register of Historic Places in New Jersey
Renaissance Revival architecture in New Jersey
Roman Catholic churches completed in 1836
19th-century Roman Catholic church buildings in the United States
Churches in Passaic County, New Jersey
National Register of Historic Places in Passaic County, New Jersey
New Jersey Register of Historic Places